Jum'a-Mohammad Mohammadi was the Afghan Minister for Mines and Industries under the Afghan Transitional Administration. He died in a plane crash on February 24, 2003 while returning from a mission in Pakistan to learn techniques in copper mining. He was in his late 60s.

Mohammadi had served in Afghanistan in the 1970s as water and power minister under president Mohammad Daoud. He was later imprisoned for two years after communists took over in a 1978 coup and assassinated Daoud.  After being released, Mohammedi fled to the United States and spent most of the 1980s and 1990s there working as a construction engineer and for the World Bank.

He was appointed to his position as Minister by interim president Hamid Karzai during a loya jirga in June, 2002.

External links
File photo

Year of birth missing
2003 deaths
Victims of aviation accidents or incidents in Asia
Afghan refugees
Industry ministers of Afghanistan
Mining ministers of Afghanistan